The Field Maple Acer campestre cultivar 'Eastleigh Weeping' or 'Weeping Eastleigh Field Maple' is a weeping tree that originated as a seedling at the Hillier & Son nursery, Ampfield, England, and was released in 1980. No trees are known to survive of this cultivar.

Description
The tree is noted for its weak pendulous habit. It is less pendulous than the other Field Maple cultivars 'Pendulum' and 'Green Weeping'.

Cultivation
As with the species, the cultivar thrives best in a semi shade position, on a fertile, well-drained soil. The tree is mentioned in several American websites, suggesting it was introduced to the United States. 'Eastleigh Weeping' no longer remains in commerce in the UK.

Accessions
The tree growing at the Sir Harold Hillier Gardens died; no other accessions are known.

References

Field maple cultivars
Weeping trees
Extinct cultivars